James Willis Downing (August 22, 1913 – February 13, 2018) was a lieutenant in the United States Navy. At the time of his death, he was the second-oldest living survivor of the attack on Pearl Harbor, about which he authored a book.

Background
Downing was born in Oak Grove, Missouri. At the time of his high school graduation, America was in the Great Depression. Jobs were scarce, so Downing enlisted in the Navy in September 1932. He began serving at Long Beach Naval Shipyard, California, the port for most of the Pacific naval fleet.

Pearl Harbor
On the morning of December 7, 1941, Downing and his new wife Morena were staying with his shipmates in Honolulu. The radio announced an attack on the Naval Station Pearl Harbor, and the sailors rushed to the port.

By the time Downing arrived at the West Virginia, Japanese bombers had targeted her with nine torpedoes. Moored at a shallow water depth of only , the ship had not completely sunk, and her deck was on fire.

Downing tried to commit to memory the names on the dog tags of those killed, and later visited the wounded at the naval hospital. He recorded the names of the wounded and fatally injured in a notebook, along with messages they wished to convey. As the postmaster, Downing had access to the home addresses of these men, and he later wrote notes to each family, explaining what had happened to their relatives and their current condition.

Later naval career

Downing additionally assumed the role of ship chaplain. In 1954, he and his crew were exposed to very high levels of radiation from Castle Bravo, part of the series of nuclear testing at Bikini Atoll. He retired from the Navy in 1956.

After the Navy
Prior to Pearl Harbor, Downing befriended Dawson Trotman, a Christian minister who eventually founded The Navigators, an interdenominational ministry. Trotman died the same year that Downing retired from the Navy, and the Downings moved to Colorado Springs, Colorado, taking over Glen Eyrie, home of the branch there. Downing served as deputy president, chairman of the board of directors and director of the ministries in Europe, the Middle East, and Africa. He retired as a full-time minister in 1983.

Personal life
While serving together, Dawson Trotman encouraged Downing to court Morena Mae Holmes, an Arkansas native who had just graduated from Biola University in Los Angeles. They were married in July 1941 in Honolulu. On Christmas Day 1941, Morena returned to the mainland and would not see her husband again until they moved to Washington, D.C. in 1943. They each had responsibilities with The Navigators and remained in Colorado Springs after his retirement. They had seven children. Morena died on February 9, 2010, at age 93. Downing died on February 13, 2018, at age 104.

Book
In 2016, Downing wrote an autobiography, titled The Other Side of Infamy: My Journey through Pearl Harbor and the World of War. The book details his military career, Pearl Harbor, and how people of faith endure troubled times. Writing at age 102 years and 176 days when the final draft of his book was accepted for publication, Downing was honored by the Guinness World Records as the "oldest male author"; i.e., oldest male to author a book. With his death two years later at 104, his title transitioned to "oldest author ever". Despite the male qualification, Guinness themselves state the oldest female author to be Bertha Wood, aged 100, which means Downing is the oldest verified author of all time, according to Guinness. Somewhat contradictorily, however, Guinness has also stated that Sarah Louise and Annie Elizabeth Delany were the oldest authors of all time, at 105 years and 103 years, respectively; however, this depends on whether the Delany sisters are to be given co-authorship credit for the book which they were the primary subject of.

References

1913 births
2018 deaths
American centenarians
Men centenarians
American evangelists
United States Navy personnel of World War II
Attack on Pearl Harbor
Military personnel from Missouri
People from Colorado Springs, Colorado
People from Jackson County, Missouri
United States Navy chaplains
20th-century American naval officers
United States Merchant Marine Academy faculty
Writers from Colorado
Writers from Missouri
United States Navy personnel of the Korean War
Military personnel from Colorado